Livio Wenger (born 20 January 1993) is a Swiss long track speed skater and inline speed skater. In 2017, he competed in The World Games 2017 in Wroclaw, Poland where he won a silver medal in the 10k track points-elimination. At the 2018 Winter Olympics he competed in the 1500 metres, 5000 metres and in the Mass start where he finished fourth.

Personal records

References

External links
 

1993 births
Living people
Swiss male speed skaters
Olympic speed skaters of Switzerland
Speed skaters at the 2018 Winter Olympics
Speed skaters at the 2022 Winter Olympics
Place of birth missing (living people)
World Games silver medalists
Competitors at the 2017 World Games
People from Lucerne-Land District
Sportspeople from the canton of Lucerne
21st-century Swiss people